Octabromodiphenyl ether (octaBDE, octa-BDE, OBDE, octa, octabromodiphenyl oxide, OBDPO) is a brominated flame retardant which belongs to the group of polybrominated diphenyl ethers (PBDEs).

Composition, uses, and production
Commercial octaBDE (also known as "Octabrom") is a technical mixture of different PBDE congeners having an average of 7.2 to 7.7 bromine atoms per molecule of diphenyl ether.  The predominant congeners in commercial octaBDE are those of heptabromodiphenyl ether and octaBDE. The term octaBDE alone refers to isomers of octabromodiphenyl ether (PBDE congener numbers 194–205).

Only congeners with more than 1% listed.

OctaBDE is used in conjunction with antimony trioxide as a flame retardant in the housings of electrical and electronic equipment, mainly in the plastic acrylonitrile butadiene styrene, but also in high impact polystyrene, polybutylene terephthalate and polyamides. Typically 12–15% of the weight of the final product will consist of octaBDE.

The annual demand worldwide was estimated as 3,790 tonnes in 2001, of which Asia accounted for 1,500 tonnes, the Americas 1,500 tonnes, and Europe 610 tonnes.  The United Nations Environment Programme reports "Since 2004, it [octaBDE] is no longer produced in the EU, USA and the Pacific Rim and there is no information that indicates it is being produced in developing countries."

Environmental chemistry
OctaBDE is released by different processes into the environment, such as emissions from the manufacture of octaBDE-containing products and from the products themselves. Elevated concentrations can be found in air, water, soil, food, sediment, sludge, and dust.

In the environment, "photolysis, anaerobic degradation and metabolism in biota" can cause debromination of octaBDE, which produces PBDEs with fewer bromine atoms "which may have higher toxicity and bioaccumulation potential."

Exposures and health effects
OctaBDE may enter the body by ingestion or inhalation.  It is "stored mainly in body fat" and may stay in the body for years.  In an investigation carried out by the WWF, "the brominated flame retardant chemical (PBDE 153), which is a component of the penta- and octa- brominated diphenyl ether flame retardant products" was found in all blood samples of 14 ministers of health and environment of 13 European Union countries.

The chemical has no proven health effects in humans; however, based on animal experiments, octaBDE may have effects on "the liver, thyroid, and neurobehavioral development."

Governmental actions
The European Union has carried out a comprehensive risk assessment under the Existing Substances Regulation 793/93/EEC. As a consequence, the EU has banned the use of octaBDE since 2004.

In the United States, as of 2005, "no new manufacture or import of" pentaBDE and octaBDE "can occur... without first being subject to EPA [i.e., United States Environmental Protection Agency ] evaluation."  As of mid-2007, a total of eleven states in the U.S. had banned octaBDE.

In May 2009, commercial octaBDE was added to the Stockholm Convention as it meets the criteria for the so-called persistent organic pollutants of persistence, bioaccumulation and toxicity.

Alternatives
Alternatives to octaBDE include tetrabromobisphenol A, 1,2-bis (pentabromophenoxy) ethane, 1,2-bis(tribromophenoxy)ethane, triphenyl phosphate, resorcinol bis(diphenylphosphate), and brominated polystyrene; however, for each of these "the existing data on toxicological and ecotoxicological effects are fewer than for octabromodiphenyl ether."

References

Flame retardants
Bromoarenes
Phenol ethers